Stealers Wheel is the debut studio album by Scottish folk rock band Stealers Wheel. It was released on 17 November 1972 by A&M Records. The album was a critical and commercial success, reaching No. 50 in the US Billboard 200 album chart, with their hit single "Stuck in the Middle with You" coming from the album.

The cover painting is by John Patrick Byrne. The words "Stealers Wheel" are embedded ten times in the design, in addition to the large lettering in the bottom left-hand corner (eleven in total).

Track listing

Personnel
Stealers Wheel
 Gerry Rafferty - guitar, lead vocals
 Joe Egan - keyboards, guitar, lead vocals
 Paul Pilnick - lead guitar, rhythm guitar (on "I Get By")
 Tony Williams - bass
 Rod Coombes - drums
with:
 Iain Campbell - bass
 Luther Grosvenor - lap steel guitar (on "Stuck In The Middle With You"), lead guitar (on "I Get By"), acoustic guitar, harmony and backing vocals (on "Late Again")  
 (uncredited - saxophone)

Production 
 Geoff Emerick, John Mills - engineering. The album went on to receive the European Edison Award for recording excellence.

Charts

References

1972 debut albums
Stealers Wheel albums
Albums produced by Jerry Leiber
Albums produced by Mike Stoller
A&M Records albums
Albums recorded at Apple Studios